The  elm cultivar Ulmus 'Rotundifolia' was raised from seed at the Jardin des plantes, Paris, and first described by Carrière in Revue Horticole, 1868, as Ulmus rotundifolia. It was later listed by Mottet in Nicholson & Mottet, Dictionnaire pratique d'horticulture et de jardinage (1898), as Ulmus campestris var.rotundifolia Hort.. It was considered "possibly Ulmus carpinifolia" (: minor) by Green.

Description
The tree was described as having distinctive rounded, oval or suborbicular leaves, almost symmetrical at base, up to 12 cm long by 8 to 10 cm wide, and appearing furrowed or "bubbled" on the upper surface.

Cultivation
No specimens are known to survive.

References

External links
 "Herbarium specimen BR0000027730683V". Botanic Garden, Meise. Sheet labelled Ulmus montana var. rotundifolia (C. Aigret; 1903)

Ulmus
Missing elm cultivars